Manunggal Air Services was an airline based in Jakarta, Indonesia. It operated charter passenger and cargo services within Indonesia and neighbouring regions. Its main base was Halim Perdanakusuma Airport, Jakarta.

History

The airline was established and started operations in 1997.

In March 2007 the Indonesian transport ministry, under huge political pressure to improve air safety in Indonesia, warned it would close seven airlines unless they improved training and maintenance within the following three months. The ministry developed a formula for ranking the airlines in three bands. Those in the third (least safe) band are: Adam Air, Batavia Air, Jatayu Airlines, Kartika Airlines, Manunggal Air Services, Transwisata Prima Aviation and Tri-MG Intra Asia Airlines.

Destinations 

Before its closing, the airline offered the following destinations:

Halim Perdanakusuma International Airport-Jakarta hub
Ketapang Airport-Ketapang
Supadio Airport-Pontianak
Wamena Airport-Wamena
Mopah Airport-Merauke

Fleet 
The Manunggal Air Service fleet consisted of the following aircraft (as of August 2016):

The airline previously operated the following aircraft (as of June 2012):
 1 British Aerospace 146-100
 2 Transall C-160 (PK-VTP and PK-VTQ)
 Antonov An-26B
 Fokker F28 Fellowship

Incidents and accidents 
 On 11 June 1999, 5 minutes after take off the ATC lost contact with a Kamov helicopter. Two hours later the helicopter was reported missing and ATC started searching. The helicopter was found crashed inland of Irian Jaya. One person was killed and five people were injured.
 On 15 June 2001 a Transall C-160NG (registered PK-VTP) was heavily damaged after landing at Jayapura-Sentani Airport 
 On 6 March 2008 their other Transall C-160NG (registered PK-VTQ) was destroyed on landing. All the plane's occupants survived.

References 

Defunct airlines of Indonesia
Airlines established in 1997
Airlines disestablished in 2015
Airlines formerly banned in the European Union
1997 establishments in Indonesia
Cargo airlines of Indonesia